Eththan, also known as Ethan, is a 2011 Indian Tamil-language comedy drama film written and directed by L Suresh. The film stars Vimal and Sanusha, whilst Jayaprakash and Sarvajit appear in supporting roles. The music was composed by Taj Noor. A remake of the 2010 Telugu film Kalavar King, directed by Suresh himself, the film was released on 27 May 2011, with moderate review.

Plot
Sathyamoorthy is the son of a schoolteacher named DK in Kumbakonam. Sathya is a happy-go-lucky youngster who yearns to do business. To achieve his "mission", he borrows money from all quarters and is almost drowned in debts. Even as his father advises him to start leading life in a right manner, enters a student named Selvi. Sathya gets acquainted to Selvi, and his life takes a turn. Meanwhile, Selvi is in trouble because her uncle Pandiyan, a rowdy, wants her to marry him. This proposal was ignored by Selvi, and she hated Pandiyan because he killed her father. One day while goofing around with Sathya, Selvi loses the necklace that Pandiyan had given her. Sathya and Selvi escape to Chennai, but Pandiyan and a corrupt inspector come and trouble them. Sathya brilliantly switches on the police's cordless phone, through which the Assistant Commissioner of Police learns about Pandiyan and arrests him. The film ends with Sathya opening a cable TV station and becoming successful.

Cast

Soundtrack
The soundtrack was composed by Taj Noor in his second venture after Vamsam.

References

External links
 

Tamil remakes of Telugu films
2011 comedy-drama films
Indian comedy-drama films
2011 films
2010s Tamil-language films